Señorita Panamá 2001, the 19th Señorita Panamá pageant and 36th celebration of the Miss Panamá contest,  was held at the Grand Ballroom of the Riande Continental Hotel, in Ciudad de Panamá, Panamá, on August 30, 2001. The winner of the pageant was Justine Pasek later Miss Universe 2002.

The pageant was broadcast on September 10 through RPC-TVPanamá Channel 4. 12 contestants from all over Panama competed for the prestigious crown. At the conclusion of the final night of competition, outgoing titleholder Ivette Cordovez Usuga of Panama Centro  crowned Justine Pasek of Panama Centro as the new Señorita Panamá.

In the same night was celebrated the election of the "Señorita Panamá World",  was announced the winner of the Señorita Panamá Mundo title. Señorita Panamá World 2000 Ana Raquel Ochy Pozo of Coclé crowned Lourdes Cristina González Montenegro of Los Santos  as the new Señorita Panamá World.

Pasek competed in the Miss Universe 2002 pageant, held at the Coliseo Roberto Clemente, in San Juan, Puerto Rico on May 29, 2002. She became the first woman to assume the title of Miss Universe when the Miss Universe Organization revoked the crown from then-reigning winner Oxana Fedorova for not fulfilling the duties stipulated in her contract. She was formally crowned Miss Universe 2002 by pageant co-owner Donald Trump in New York City.

In other hands González  competed in Miss World 2001, the 51st edition of the Miss World pageant, was held on 16 November 2001 at the Super Bowl of Sun City Entertainment Centre in Sun City, South Africa.

Results

Special awards

Contestants 
These are the competitors who have been selected this year.

Election schedule

Thursday August 30 Final night, coronation of Señorita Panamá 2001

Contestant notes
Justine Pasek became Miss Universe 2002 and was formally crowned by pageant co-owner Donald Trump in New York City on September 24, 2002.
Bertha Peric Torres won Miss Atlantic International 2005 in Punte del Este, Uruguay.
Jessica Segui Barrios competed in Miss Earth 2003 as Miss Earth Panamá 2003  and won the Best National Costume. On September 27, 2010, Jessica Segui died in a Panamanian hospital due to cerebral aneurysm.

References

External links
 Señorita Panamá  official website
MissPanama.net

Señorita Panamá
2001 beauty pageants